Sidney Raymond Eudy (born December 16, 1960) is an American former professional wrestler. He is best known for his various Sid gimmicks, each distinguished by the ring names Sid Justice, Sid Vicious,  and Sycho Sid in World Championship Wrestling and the World Wrestling Federation (WWF, later WWE). 

Eudy is a six-time world champion, having won the WWF Championship twice, the WCW World Heavyweight Championship twice, and the USWA Unified World Heavyweight Championship twice. In addition to world title success, Eudy held the WCW United States Heavyweight Championship once, among other accolades. During his tenures with the WWF and WCW, Eudy headlined multiple pay-per-views for both organizations, main-eventing WrestleMania VIII and WrestleMania 13 in 1992 and 1997 respectively as well as Starrcade in 2000.

Professional wrestling career

Early career (1987–1989) 
Eudy entered the wrestling sport after an encounter with Randy Savage and his brother Lanny Poffo. After being trained by Tojo Yamamoto, Eudy made his debut as he teamed with Austin Idol and wrestled the team of Nick Bockwinkel and Jerry Lawler. He then adopted the masked wrestler persona known as Lord Humongous. He began his career in Continental Championship Wrestling (CCW) in 1987, under a mask and the name Lord Humungous. On Christmas Day 1987 he won the NWA Southeastern Heavyweight Championship (Northern Division), going on to be the final titleholder.  Later he turned fan favourite after rekindling a (kayfabe) childhood friendship with Shane Douglas, resulting in the two forming a tag team and capturing the NWA Southeastern Tag Team Championship. He also competed in New Japan Pro-Wrestling (NJPW), where he challenged Tatsumi Fujinami for the IWGP Heavyweight Championship under the name Vicious Warrior, but was unable to win the title. Eudy then made a very brief stint in World Class Championship Wrestling (WCCW), where he adopted one of his most notable ring names: Sid Vicious, which he took from the punk rock musician of the same name who played bass for the Sex Pistols.

NWA World Championship Wrestling (1989–1991)

The Skyscrapers (1989) 

In 1989, Eudy signed with World Championship Wrestling and retained his Sid Vicious ring name. He made his televised debut in WCW by defeating DeWayne Bruce on the June 17, 1989 episode of Pro. Originally slated as a singles wrestler, Eudy was eventually paired with Danny Spivey to form The Skyscrapers. Managed by Teddy Long, The Skyscrapers feuded with The Steiner Brothers and The Road Warriors. During this time, he incorporated the Powerbomb as his finishing move. However, the team was short-lived; Eudy was replaced by "Mean" Mark Callous after suffering a broken rib and a punctured lung during a match with The Steiner Brothers at the November 1989 Clash of the Champions IX.

Four Horsemen (1990–1991) 

Following his recovery, Eudy was introduced on the May 11, 1990 edition of NWA Power Hour as the newest member of Ric Flair's Four Horsemen, and he was billed by the ring announcers as being from "wherever he damn well pleases". Sid was the "muscle" of the group and initially brought in to counter-act the strength of RoboCop at Capital Combat. His first televised match back was a 26-second loss to Lex Luger on Clash of the Champions XI: Coastal Crush in which the referee performed a fast three count (in an interview in 2018, Sid stated the reason for the quick loss was punishment by booker Ole Anderson for having been seen playing softball during time off while he was rehabilitating from his punctured lung). As one of the Horsemen, Eudy feuded with Paul Orndorff and the Junkyard Dog. He attacked NWA World Heavyweight Champion Sting following the champion's title match of Clash of the Champions XII, setting up his first feud as a singles wrestler. At Halloween Havoc, a fake Sting (Barry Windham), in collusion with Sid, let Sid pin him after switching places with the real Sting in order for Sid to win the belt. However, they were thwarted when the real Sting came out and beat Sid to retain the title.

Sid's association with the Horsemen became tenuous following this episode, and he began a quasi-face run in November 1990 when he faced The Nightstalker at Clash of the Champions XIII: Thanksgiving Thunder, which Eudy won. However, was attacked post-match by the debuting Big Cat, in response of which Sid recruited former partner Spivey for a short-lived reunion of the Skyscrapers at Starrcade in December, where the two defeated The Big Cat and The Motor City Madman. Following this match Eudy made an abrupt return to heel status, ending Trucker Norm's WCW run in January 1991 and squashing Joey Maggs at Clash of the Champions XIV: Dixie Dynamite later that month. He returned to full-fledged Horsemen activity and participated in the WarGames match at WrestleWar. The Horsemen amicably split in April 1991, during which time he entered negotiations with the WWF. Despite a huge contract offer and a promise of a world championship run, Eudy announced his intentions to leave WCW. Before departing he had a short feud with 7'7" (231 cm) tall El Gigante (who was billed as being 8'0" (242 cm)), that ended with his loss to the giant at SuperBrawl I.

World Wrestling Federation (1991–1992) 
At a Superstars taping on May 28, 1991, Eudy made his WWF debut in an untelevised segment attacking The Mountie following Mountie's open offer. He defeated Ted DiBiase in his first WWF match at a non-televised event in Calgary on July 8. On the June 8 episode of Prime Time Wrestling, vignettes began airing promoting his WWF debut and introducing him as Sid Justice. On the July 20 episode of Superstars, Eudy debuted on WWF television and was announced as the special guest referee for the main event of that year's SummerSlam, where The Ultimate Warrior and the WWF Champion Hulk Hogan teamed up against The Triangle of Terror (Sgt. Slaughter, Col. Mustafa, and Gen. Adnan) in a 3-on-2 handicap match. Later that night, Sid saved Randy Savage and Miss Elizabeth from an attack at the hands of Jake Roberts and The Undertaker at the newly wed couple's reception. During this time, Sid defeated Kato in his first televised match on the September 21 episode of Superstars. In a match with Roberts, Sid injured his biceps and was forced to miss the Survivor Series pay-per-view.

Sid returned at the Royal Rumble, which had a special stipulation: the winner would win the vacant WWF Championship, which had been stripped from Hulk Hogan. Sid entered at No. 29 and was among the final four wrestlers, along with Hogan, Randy Savage, and Ric Flair, before he eliminated both Savage and then Hogan, leaving himself and Flair in the ring. Hogan, who was still at ringside after being eliminated, grabbed Sid's arm and tried to pull him over the top rope, giving Flair the chance to grab Sid's legs and throw him out to win the match and become the new WWF Champion. Less than a week later, on the January 25 episode of Superstars, WWF President Jack Tunney held a press conference to announce who would face Flair for the WWF Championship at WrestleMania VIII. Before Tunney even announced who the number one contender would be, Sid stood up as if Tunney called his name. Yet to Sid's annoyance, Tunney chose Hogan. Sid clutched the stack of papers he fanned himself with earlier and gave a menacing glance in Hogan's direction. After the press conference, Sid said what Jack Tunney did was "bogus."  Sid later issued an apology to Hogan, which Hogan accepted. Sid and Hogan then teamed up to face The Undertaker and Flair on Saturday Night's Main Event XXX. During the match, after he double clotheslined Undertaker and Flair, Hogan reached to Sid for a tag. However, Sid refused to tag in and walked out of the match. Despite this, Hogan won the match by disqualification.

On February 23 on an episode of Wrestling Challenge, Sid appeared as a guest on Brutus "The Barber" Beefcake's "The Barber Shop". Knowing that Hulk Hogan (Beefcake's long-time real-life friend) was not in the arena, Sid threatened Beefcake and chased him off the set before destroying the Barber Shop with a chair. Later that night, it was announced that Hogan would battle Sid (and not WWF Champion Ric Flair) at the main event of WrestleMania VIII, resulting in Flair facing Randy Savage for the WWF Championship instead. A week later, Sid hired Harvey Whippleman as his manager. Sid also began a post-match gimmick where he would further "injure" his defeated opponents with one or more powerbombs (his finishing move), and sometimes – after the defeated wrestler placed on a stretcher – following this up by grabbing the stretcher and running it into a fixture, such as a ring post or guardrail. At WrestleMania VIII, Sid lost his match to Hogan by disqualification when Papa Shango interfered on Sid's behalf, allowing the two to double-team Hogan until the returning Ultimate Warrior stormed the ring and saved Hogan. Nearing the end of the match, Sid kicked out of Hogan's trademark running leg drop. Sid was disqualified when Whippleman quickly jumped into the ring to get involved.

On a November 22, 2011, edition of Wrestling Observer Radio, Dave Meltzer confirmed that Sid failed a drug test prior to his WrestleMania match with Hulk Hogan. He was allowed to do the match and then went on their European tour. After the tour, he was told he was going to serve his suspension, resulting in Eudy quitting instead and pursuing a career in softball. At the time of his departure from the WWF, Sid was about to embark on a feud with The Ultimate Warrior, the story being that Sid was angry the Warrior had stuck his nose in his business at WrestleMania VIII. Eudy competed on the WWF's European tour in April 1992, then began his feud with Warrior in the United States. They wrestled on two house shows, with Warrior winning twice by disqualification. After wrestling Warrior in Boston, Massachusetts on April 26, Eudy voluntarily quit the company due to disagreements with the Warrior and WWF management in particular about the outcome of his match with Warrior. The WWF replaced Sid with Papa Shango in the feud with Warrior.

Return to WCW (1993) 
Eudy, under his Sid Vicious ring name, returned to WCW in May 1993 as a mystery competitor of Col. Robert Parker against Van Hammer at Slamboree. Sid defeated Hammer in a stretcher match. That summer he teamed with Big Van Vader and reignited his feud with Sting. At Fall Brawl, Sting's team (Sting, Davey Boy Smith, Dustin Rhodes, and The Shockmaster) defeated Sid's team (Sid, Vader, and Harlem Heat) in a WarGames match. At Halloween Havoc, Sid faced Sting in a rematch of the same pay-per-view three years previous, but was beaten via a roll-up. The following week on television Sid turned on Rob Parker and became a babyface. This would be Sid's last appearance with WCW before being released from his contract due to an incident with Arn Anderson. It had been planned to have Sid challenge then WCW World Heavyweight Champion Vader at that year's Starrcade, but Sid's departure removed him from this match and Ric Flair was elevated to be the challenger against Vader. Based on Worldwide tapings that took place prior to his departure, Sid would have defeated Vader and become the new champion.

United States Wrestling Association (1994–1996) 
Following his departure from WCW, Eudy returned to what was now WCCW merged into United States Wrestling Association (USWA) in Memphis, where he began feuding with old rival Jerry Lawler. On July 16, he won the promotion's Unified World Heavyweight Championship by forfeit when Lawler, who had been attacked and injured by Eudy earlier in the card, could not appear for the scheduled match. While Lawler was able to defeat Eudy in non-title matches, Eudy was able to retain his title in several championship defenses through screwjobs initiated by The Spellbinder, his ally at the time. Sid also participated in the UWF Blackjack Brawl in September 1994, challenging "Dr. Death" Steve Williams for the UWF World Heavyweight Championship. On February 6, 1995, Lawler won the USWA Unified World Heavyweight Championship back from Sid. Later the two of them were tag team partners. Once again on August 30, 1996, Sid won the title back from Lawler. On September 2 he dropped the title back to Lawler.

Return to WWF (1995–1997)

Alliance with Shawn Michaels and Million Dollar Corporation (1995) 

On the February 20, 1995 episode of Raw Sid entered the WWE as the bodyguard of Shawn Michaels. Along with Jenny McCarthy, Sid accompanied Michaels to ringside for Michaels' WWF Championship match against then-champion and Michaels' former bodyguard, Diesel, at WrestleMania XI. Michaels had the match won after hitting his signature Superkick, but Sid stood on the ring apron and distracted referee Earl Hebner, allowing Diesel time to recover and pin Michaels after a Jackknife Powerbomb to win the match and retain his title. The next night on Raw, Michaels expressed dissatisfaction with Sid's interference and gave him the night off for his rematch against Diesel at the first-ever In Your House pay-per-view. In response, Sid replied to Shawn, "You don't give me the night off!", and attacked Michaels from behind before hitting him with a powerbomb three times, turning Michaels into a face again. Diesel came to Michaels' aid and clotheslined Sid over the top rope. Michaels claimed to have sustained a legitimate back injury as a result of the attack and was sidelined for six weeks, thus taking him out of the title match.

Two weeks later on the April 17 episode of Raw, Ted DiBiase announced Sid as the newest member of the Million Dollar Corporation after Bam Bam Bigelow left the Corporation. After joining, Sid challenged Diesel to a match for the WWF Championship at in Your House, which Diesel accepted. Diesel won the match via disqualification, and thus retained his title, when Tatanka interfered. After the match, Sid and Tatanka continued to double-team Diesel until Bam Bam Bigelow came out to save him. At the King of the Ring, Diesel and Bam Bam Bigelow defeated Sid and Tatanka. Sid faced Diesel once again at In Your House 2: The Lumberjacks for the WWF Championship in a lumberjack match, which Diesel won to end the feud. Following this, Sid moved on to a feud with Shawn Michaels and was scheduled to face him at SummerSlam, but was replaced by Razor Ramon at the request of WWF President Gorilla Monsoon, with Ramon challenging for Michaels' Intercontinental Championship in a ladder match as Sid was seen watching on the backstage television monitors. On the September 5 episode of Raw, Sid faced Michaels for the title but lost after being hit with three superkicks. Sid then started a brief feud with Henry Godwinn, culminating in a victory over Godwinn at In Your House 3: Triple Header.

On the November 13 episode of Raw, Sid faced the Intercontinental Champion Razor Ramon in a non-title match, with Ramon's friend The 1–2–3 Kid as the special guest referee. Razor was about to deliver the Razor's Edge on Sid, but The 1–2–3 Kid helped Sid avoid it, allowing Sid to pin Ramon after a powerbomb, with the Kid making a fast count. After the match, the Kid turned heel and joined the Million Dollar Corporation. In the first elimination match at Survivor Series, Sid and Corporation leader Ted DiBiase helped The 1–2–3 Kid pin Marty Jannetty to win and become the sole survivor for his team. Later in the event, Sid was randomly teamed up with his rival Shawn Michaels, Ahmed Johnson, and The British Bulldog to face Yokozuna, Owen Hart, Razor Ramon, and Dean Douglas in a "Wild Card" Survivor Series match. Sid was eliminated by Razor Ramon after Michaels hit Sid with superkick. After his elimination, Sid powerbombed Michaels. At In Your House 5: Seasons Beatings, Razor Ramon and Marty Jannetty defeated Sid and The 1–2–3 Kid. Sid and The 1–2–3 Kid teamed up the next night to participate in the first-ever Raw Bowl, which The Smoking Gunns won. Shortly after, Sid suffered a serious neck injury and left the WWF.

WWF Champion (1996–1997) 

Eudy would not be seen again until the July 8 episode of Raw, when he took up the gimmick of "Sycho Sid". Under this version of his Sid gimmick, Eudy was a strident-voiced and intense character, prone to erratically unstable mannerisms, such as in his random contemplative stares off into the distance, excessive eye-blinking, laughter turned sudden seriousness, etc. In his return, he was announced as the replacement for The Ultimate Warrior (who left the WWF) for the six-man tag team match, teaming with former rival Shawn Michaels and Ahmed Johnson against Vader, Owen Hart, and The British Bulldog at the main event of In Your House 9: International Incident, effectively making him a face. However, Sid's team lost the match. 
The next night on Raw, Sid started a feud with The British Bulldog, whom he faced at SummerSlam on August 18 and pinned after a powerbomb. At In Your House 10: Mind Games on September 22, Shawn Michaels hit Mankind with the Sweet Chin Music and went for the pin to retain the WWF Championship, but Vader came out, broke up the count, attacked him, which got Mankind disqualified. After the match, Mankind and Vader double-teamed Michaels until Sid came out to make the save. He and Vader fought their way backstage, starting a feud between the two.

Sid fought Vader at In Your House 11: Buried Alive on October 20 in a match where the winner would face Shawn Michaels for the WWF Championship at Survivor Series on November 17. As Sid was about to powerbomb Vader, Vader's manager Jim Cornette got on the ring apron to distract him. Michaels responded and pulled Cornette off the apron before hitting him with the Sweet Chin Music. Sid then pinned Vader with a chokeslam to win the match and to become the number-one contender for the WWF Championship. After the match, Sid celebrated his victory with Michaels.

At the  Survivor Series, history repeated itself. Sid grabbed a camera from the operator and prepared to hit Michaels with it. Michaels' manager, Jose Lothario, got on the ring apron and told Sid to put the camera down, but he refused and hit Lothario in the chest with it instead. Although this was the act of a heel, the audience cheered wildly for him and booed Michaels, just as they had done, in Sid's favor, four and a half years earlier against Hogan at the Royal Rumble. Sid dropped the camera, and as soon as he turned around, Michaels hit him with the Sweet Chin Music; however, Michaels went outside the ring to check on his manager instead of going for the pin. Sid hit Michaels in the back with the camera, then threw him back in the ring before hitting him with the powerbomb to win the WWF Championship. At In Your House 12: It's Time on December 15, Sid defended the title against Bret Hart in a match where the winner would defend the title against Shawn Michaels at the 1997 Royal Rumble on January 19. Hart made Sid tap out to the Sharpshooter, but the referee was knocked out and unable to witness the submission. As Michaels was commentating at ringside, Sid and Hart left the ring and started fighting right beside him. After Sid had pushed Michaels and then climbed into the ring with Hart, Michaels went to hit Sid but the latter threw Hart into him. He then pinned him after a powerbomb to retain the title.

At the Royal Rumble, Sid lost the title to Michaels. During the match, Sid hit the chokeslam on Michaels and repeatedly powerbombed him outside the ring. Later on in the match, Jose Lothario got on the ring apron, and Sid approached him, but before he could do anything to him, Michaels hit Sid in the back and the face with the camera, knocking him out in the process. Michaels went for the pin, but Sid managed to kick out. Michaels then hit Sid with Sweet Chin Music to become the WWF World Heavyweight Champion for the second time. He soon forfeited that same title due to being unable to wrestle, a claim widely disputed by many during that time, especially Bret Hart, who still believes that Michaels did not want to drop the title to him at WrestleMania 13. At In Your House 13: Final Four in Chattanooga, a four corners elimination title match was held for the vacant championship belt between Bret Hart, The Undertaker, Stone Cold Steve Austin and Vader. Hart won, and was scheduled to face Sid the following night, on the February 17, 1997, episode of Raw. During that match, Hart had Sid trapped in the Sharpshooter submission when Stone Cold Steve Austin, whom Hart was feuding with, came to the outside of the ring and hit Hart with a steel chair, allowing Sid to hit Hart with the powerbomb to win the WWF Championship for the second time.

At WrestleMania 13 on March 23, Sid lost the title against The Undertaker when Hart interfered during the match, allowing the latter to hit the Tombstone Piledriver and pin Sid to win the WWF Championship. The next night on Raw is War, Sid made one more appearance after Bret Hart attacked an injured Shawn Michaels in the ring after a face-to-face promo about Hart turning on the fans. Sid was promoted as wrestling Bret at the April In Your House, and vs Mankind in May, but both ended up cancelled due to Sid sustaining a neck injury. He returned on the 2nd June Raw, losing a non-title match to the Undertaker. At King of the Ring on June 8, Sid and The Legion of Doom faced The Hart Foundation (Owen Hart, The British Bulldog, and Jim Neidhart) in a six-man tag team match, which The Hart Foundation won when Owen pinned Sid with a roll-up. On June 9, Sid defeated Owen on Raw before disappearing from television for over a month. His last match was a loss to Owen in a house show in Toronto, Canada. He returned on the July 14 episode of Raw, making a brief final appearance, and despite being promoted as wrestling Vader at SummerSlam he was released by the WWF once again to recover from a neck injury that would require surgery.

Independent Circuit (1998) 
After leaving WWF from a neck injury and being inactive for nearly a year, Sid wrestled in the independent circuit in Mississippi and New Jersey. He defeated King Kong Bundy at the Eddie Gilbert Memorial Brawl on February 28. Sid would work for Power Pro Wrestling in Tennessee.

Extreme Championship Wrestling (1999) 
After some time on the Tennessee independent circuit, Eudy debuted in Extreme Championship Wrestling (ECW) in January 1999, where he had matches with The Dudley Boyz, John Kronus, Skull Von Krush and Justin Credible. He left ECW in May due to the monetary problems plaguing the promotion.

Second return to WCW (1999–2001)

The Millennium Man and United States Heavyweight Champion (1999) 
At the behest of his real-life friends Kevin Nash and Scott Hall, Eudy returned to WCW at The Great American Bash in June 1999, joining Randy Savage's heel stable Team Madness. Upon his return, he took the nickname of "The Millennium Man" and faced the WCW World Champion Kevin Nash on the July 5, 1999, episode of WCW Nitro. Sid was dubbed as undefeated having a winning streak much like Goldberg had previously; although, the majority of this streak was due to Sid coming to the ring and power bombing wrestlers already in a match or immediately following their match and thus "defeating" them.

On September 12, 1999, Sid won his first and only WCW United States Heavyweight Championship from Chris Benoit at Fall Brawl. He then began a feud with Goldberg who challenged him for the United States Heavyweight Championship at Halloween Havoc. Earlier that night, however, their backstage fighting led Sid to require stitches, though he refused to be treated, which led to Sid bleeding openly the entire night. After brawling with Goldberg, a weary Sid lost the match due to excessive bleeding, awarding Goldberg the United States Heavyweight Championship against his opponent's will. Sid lost again to Goldberg in an "I Quit" match at Mayhem, effectively ending their feud and Sid's "streak." WCW later released a VHS home video highlighting Sid's return to WCW called Sid Vicious: Millennium Man.

World Heavyweight Champion (2000) 
After the "Millennium Man" gimmick ran dry, Sid became a face and started to contend for the WCW World Heavyweight Championship. He was placed in a match at Souled Out in January to fill the suddenly vacant title after Bret Hart was forced to relinquish it due to a concussion. Sid would lose the match to Chris Benoit, but the title was again vacated as Benoit left for the WWF the next day. The on-screen explanation was that Sid's foot was under the rope during his submission loss. The next week, Sid was presented with a challenge by Nash, who had become commissioner of WCW. If he could beat Don and Ron Harris in a match on Monday Nitro that night, he would face Nash for the championship that night. Sid managed to defeat the Harris Brothers and eventually Nash himself to win the WCW World Heavyweight Championship. Two nights later on Thunder, Nash stripped Sid of the championship due to him not beating the legal Harris brother in the match on Nitro. A rematch between Sid and Nash was set up, but Sid again defeated Nash on Nitro to win the title for a second time. He later successfully defended the title at SuperBrawl 2000 in a three-way match against Scott Hall and Jeff Jarrett.

At Uncensored, Sid defended his title against Jeff Jarrett thanks in part to help from a returning Hulk Hogan, which set up a match for the following night's Nitro pitting Sid and Hogan vs. Jarrett and Scott Steiner. During the course of the match, Sid turned heel and attacked Hogan, due to his being incensed that the fans were chanting Hogan's name. He chokeslammed Hogan and forced the referee to count Hogan being pinned, although the official result was a no contest. This apparently might have been to set up a match for the upcoming Spring Stampede pay-per-view in April. However, shortly after this, WCW began its New Blood angle and Sid (along with all the other WCW champions at the time) was stripped of his championship. He did not play a large role in the angle that followed, and was kept off of television for several months.

Injury and first retirement (2000–2001) 
He returned late in the year as a challenger for Scott Steiner's WCW World Heavyweight Championship, but Sid failed to defeat Steiner in their title match at Starrcade. On January 14, 2001, at the Sin pay-per-view in Indianapolis at Conseco Fieldhouse (now Gainbridge Fieldhouse), Sid faced Steiner, Jeff Jarrett and Road Warrior Animal in a Four Corners match for the WCW World Heavyweight Championship. During the match, however, he suffered a near career-ending injury. Members of WCW management allegedly felt that Eudy needed to broaden his arsenal of wrestling moves and suggested that he try an aerial maneuver, despite his "unwillingness". Eudy felt it unnecessary for a wrestler of his size and type to do high spots and did not feel comfortable doing them. During the match, Eudy suffered a leg fracture following his leap from the second turnbuckle in an attempted big boot on Steiner. This had him awkwardly landing with all his weight on one foot while kicking with the other, severely fracturing the leg he landed on. Eudy broke his left leg in half, snapping both the tibia and fibula, with at least one of the bones breaking through the skin and rotating his foot without his input at 90 degrees anti-clockwise. The fracture was too graphic for many television stations to re-air, although it was shown on the following Nitro.

The injury put Sid out of action indefinitely, and he pondered retiring from wrestling for good: "I had about a year left on my contract, and I was thinking back then prior to hurting my leg what was I going to do as far as wrapping up my career. The only thing I really wanted to do was ideally go out in a big pay-per-view, like a WrestleMania or something like that main event, leave like that, and not come back again. It would really be the retirement match". A 17-inch (43 cm) rod was placed in his leg during the two-hour surgery. For a while, Eudy used a cane to walk. Sid later sued WCW, claiming that he was made to jump off the second rope against his objections. The injury forced a plot change in the SuperBrawl Revenge event. The main event was supposed to be Kevin Nash, Diamond Dallas Page, and Sid against Scott Steiner, Jeff Jarrett, and Road Warrior Animal but was rewritten as Kevin Nash versus Scott Steiner. WCW would then be purchased by the WWF the following month, ceasing any possibility of Sid's return to that company.

Recovery and later career (2002–2017) 

Following surgery, Eudy was faced with the prospect of rehabilitation of his leg for three to five days per week for at least the next year. He was told by his doctor that he would never run again, and Sid set a goal of being able to do so. At first he was limited to using a cane, but through extensive effort was able to not only walk again, but in time run. During his arduous rehabilitation, Eudy made several appearances as World Wrestling All-Stars's (WWA) commissioner during its 2002 Australian tour, though at the beginning of WWA's Sydney show, it was announced that Eudy would not be featured due to a broken arm. Sid also filed a lawsuit with the Universal Wrestling Corporation (the Turner holding company for what remained of WCW's unpurchased assets), seeking redress for the injury that he sustained. The judge ultimately ruled in favor of the UWC.

After almost three and a half years of rehabilitation and preparation, Eudy returned to active wrestling on June 5, 2004 with the Canadian-based Internet Wrestling Syndicate. Appearing as Pierre Carl Ouellet's mystery partner, Eudy competed in and won a ten team battle royal. On July 14, 2007, Eudy debuted in Memphis Wrestling and started a feud with old rival Jerry Lawler while serving as "Hollywood" Jimmy Blaylock's enforcer. Sid also appeared at the Juggalo Championship Wrestling event Evansville Invasion, helping Tracy Smothers attack the promotion's Heavyweight Champion Corporal Robinson. Following this, Eudy had a match at the "Jerry Lawler 35th Anniversary Wrestling event" on November 7, 2008, at the Tennessee Fairgrounds. He wrestled in the main event and lost to Lawler. On February 28, 2009, Eudy returned to Memphis Wrestling and won a battle royal before defeating Lawler in a rematch.
Later that year Sid began a European tour with American Wrestling Rampage. He was undefeated during the tour, including wins over X-Pac. Following this Eudy's appearances were greatly reduced as he began focusing on competition in over-50 bodybuilding. He would wrestle only three times in total in 2010 and 2011, defeating Chase Stevens, Josef von Schmidt, and Eddie Kingston.

On the June 25, 2012, episode of Raw, Eudy made his return to WWE as Sycho Sid in a match against Heath Slater, where he defeated Slater as part of the ongoing celebration building up to WWE's 1000th episode of Raw. It was his first appearance on Raw since the July 14, 1997 episode and his first match on the show since June 9, 1997. Eudy would reappear on the actual 1000th episode on July 23, where he and other WWE Legends helped Lita take down Slater. On August 5, 2017, Sid wrestled the last match of his career. He defeated Paul Rosenberg in Ottawa, Ontario for Great North Wrestling.

Personal life 
Eudy and his wife, Sabrina Paige (née Estes), were married on December 30, 1983, in Shelby County, Tennessee. They have two sons: Frank, a cast member on the CBS reality show Big Brother 14 & 18, and Gunnar Eudy, who is also a wrestler.

Eudy is a fan of softball. During his time off from wrestling, he briefly played softball between 1997 and 1999.

During a WCW tour of Europe, both Eudy and Arn Anderson were involved in an argument at a hotel bar in the English town of Blackburn on October 27, 1993. Anderson threatened Eudy with a broken bottle; after being sent to their rooms by security chief Doug Dillinger, Eudy later came to Anderson's room and attacked him with a chair leg, and Anderson retaliated with a pair of scissors. Eudy received four stab wounds and Anderson received 20, losing a pint and a half of blood in the process. The fight was broken up by fellow wrestler 2 Cold Scorpio, who was credited with saving Anderson's life. Neither man pressed charges against the other, and British police declined to do so since both men would soon be leaving the country. Eudy was later fired over the incident.

In January 2011, Eudy was arrested in Shelby County, Tennessee. Initially pulled over for and charged with not wearing his seatbelt, Eudy was also charged with misdemeanor possession of marijuana and driving without a license. He was later released on $1,000 bond.

Other media 
Eudy made an appearance in the 2000 film Ready to Rumble alongside David Arquette and Scott Caan. In 2011, he starred alongside fellow wrestlers Kurt Angle and Kevin Nash in the horror movie River of Darkness. He also starred in the 2011 horror film Death from Above, alongside fellow wrestlers Kurt Angle, James Storm, Matt Morgan, Terry Gerin and Jessica Kresa. On August 2, 2012, he appeared on the CBS reality show Big Brother 14 where his son, Frank, was a contestant.

Eudy was a playable character in the NES version of WWF WrestleMania: Steel Cage Challenge, the Game Boy game WWF Superstars 2 and the SNES version of WWF Super Wrestlemania. For WCW he appeared in WCW Backstage Assault. Unrelated to any wrestling promotion he was a playable character in both Legends of Wrestling II and Showdown: Legends of Wrestling as well.

Eudy appears as Sycho Sid in WWE 2K17, as downloadable content. Sid is also part of the roster in WWE 2K18 and WWE 2K19.

Filmography

Championships and accomplishments 
 American Wrestling Federation
 AWF Super Heavyweight Championship (1 time)
 Continental Wrestling Association
 CWA Heavyweight Championship (1 time)
 NWA Northeast
 NWA Northeast Heavyweight Championship (1 time)
 Pro Wrestling Illustrated
 Comeback of the Year (1996)
 Ranked No. 16 of the top 500 singles wrestlers in the PWI 500 in 1991
 Ranked No. 122 of the top 500 singles wrestlers of the "PWI Years" in 2003
 Southeastern Championship Wrestling
 NWA Southeastern Heavyweight Championship (Northern Division) (1 time)
 NWA Southeastern Tag Team Championship (1 time) – with Shane Douglas
 United States Wrestling Association
 USWA Texas Heavyweight Championship (1 time)
 USWA Unified World Heavyweight Championship (2 times)
 World Championship Wrestling
 WCW World Heavyweight Championship (2 times)
 WCW United States Heavyweight Championship (2 times)
 World Wrestling Federation
 WWF Championship (2 times)
 Wrestling Observer Newsletter
 Most Overrated (1993)
 Readers' Least Favorite Wrestler (1993)
 Worst on Interviews (1999)
 Worst Worked Match of the Year (1990) vs. The Nightstalker

References

External links 

 
 
 
 

1960 births
20th-century professional wrestlers
American male professional wrestlers
American male sport wrestlers
American softball players
Fictional bodyguards
Fictional kings
Living people
Masked wrestlers
NWA/WCW/WWE United States Heavyweight Champions
People from Marion, Arkansas
People from West Memphis, Arkansas
Professional wrestlers from Arkansas
Stabbing survivors
The Four Horsemen (professional wrestling) members
The Million Dollar Corporation members
USWA Unified World Heavyweight Champions
WCW World Heavyweight Champions
WWE Champions
NWA Georgia Heavyweight Champions